The Ritz is a barbershop quartet from the Johnny Appleseed District of the Barbershop Harmony Society. Each member of the quartet was a vocal music teacher at the high school or university level. After coming in fourth at the San Francisco convention in 1990, the quartet won the international championship in Louisville in 1991.

The quartet has traveled internationally and has appeared on two PBS specials, Keep America Singing (in 1994) and World's Largest Concert (in 1996).

Discography
 Puttin' On The Ritz (Interactive CD; 2002)
 Rare Times (CD; 1997)
 On Moonlight Bay (CD, cassette; 1995)
 Swingin' on a Star (CD, cassette; 1994)
 Old Songs Are Just Like Old Friends (CD; 1992)
 I'm Beginning to See the Light (CD; 1991)
 The Most Wonderful Time of the Year (CD, cassette)
 The Ritz Anthology (CD; includes the previous four)
 The Ritz (cassette)

They also appear on First Recording (CD, cassette) with the Pride of Toledo Chorus.

References

External links 
 Discography and biography from Primarily A Cappella
 Discography from Mike Barkley's Monster list
 AIC entry

Professional a cappella groups
Barbershop quartets
Barbershop Harmony Society